Portnoy's Complaint is a 1972 American comedy film written and directed by Ernest Lehman. His screenplay is based on the bestselling 1969 novel of the same name by Philip Roth.

Plot
The film focuses on the trials and tribulations of Alexander Portnoy, a Jewish man employed as  the assistant commissioner of human opportunity for New York City.

During a session with his psychoanalyst (who never speaks during the film), he explores his childhood, his relationship with his overbearing mother, his sexual fantasies and desires, his problems with women, and his obsession with his own religion. Via flashbacks, we learn about his affairs with Bubbles Girardi, the daughter of a local hoodlum; leftist Israeli Naomi, whom he attempts to rape; and gentile Mary Jane Reid, whose nickname "Monkey" reflects her remarkable agility at achieving a variety of sexual positions. 

Mary Jane seemingly is the girl of Portnoy's dreams, but as their relationship deepens and she begins to pressure him into giving her a ring, he shrinks from making a permanent commitment to her. He repeatedly seems to recall, traumatically, her suicide by jumping off a building after a fight with him; but the end of the film shows him walking away from his therapist's office, and just missing, in the New York street crowd, Mary Jane, who is walking in the other direction and still alive, putting into question the entire narrative Portnoy gave his therapist.

Cast
 Richard Benjamin as Alexander Portnoy
 Karen Black as Mary Jane Reid a.k.a. The Monkey
 Lee Grant as Sophie Portnoy
 Jack Somack as Jack Portnoy
 Jeannie Berlin as Bubbles Girardi
 Jill Clayburgh as Naomi
 D. P. Barnes as Dr. Otto Spielvogel
 Francesca De Sapio as Lina
 Kevin Conway as Smolka
 Lewis J. Stadlen as Mandel
 Renée Lippin as Hannah Portnoy
 Minta Durfee as Elevator Lady

Critical reception
In contrast to Goodbye, Columbus, which did well at the box office and was liked by critics, this second attempt at Roth bombed miserably.
Roger Ebert of the Chicago Sun-Times called the film "a true fiasco" and added,
The movie has no heart and little apparent sympathy with its Jewish characters; it replaces Roth's cynical and carefully aimed satire with a bunch of offensive one-liners, and it uses the cover of a best seller to get away with ethnic libels that entirely lose their point out of Roth's specific context. And what's maybe even worse, it takes the most cherished of all Jewish stereotypes—the Jewish mother—and gets it wrong. The Sophie Portnoy of Roth's novel was at least a recognizable caricature. But the Mrs. Portnoy of the movie is simply a morass of frantic dialog, clumsily photographed. There's no person there at all.

Vincent Canby of The New York Times called it "an unqualified disaster as a film, a ponderous, off-center comedy that...is almost as tasteless as many idiots—people who don't know the difference between good tastelessness and bad tastelessness—thought the novel was, wrongly." Gene Siskel of the Chicago Tribune gave the film one star out of four and wrote "Ernest Lehman, who served as script writer and director, has replaced Alex's energy with surprisingly tame and traditional Hollywood melodrama visuals, and when these visuals are matched with a soundtrack full of dirty language, the effect is depressing." Variety was positive and called it "a most effective, honest in context, necessarily strong and appropriately bawdy study in ruinous self-indulgence. Besides adapting the Philip Roth novel into a lucid, balanced and moral screenplay, and producing handsomely on various locations, Ernest Lehman makes an excellent directorial debut. Richard Benjamin heads an outstanding cast." Charles Champlin of the Los Angeles Times described the film as an "honorable failure" in part because "Lehman does not have, or couldn't devise, a cinematic style equivalent to Roth's literary style." He also thought the film failed to capture Portnoy's complex feelings about being Jewish-American, which "are central to the book." Gary Arnold of The Washington Post found the film "entertaining at some level. Even when the filmmakers are messing up—missing the point of the Philip Roth novel or simply exploiting its sexual candor and comedy in an arbitrary, piecemeal fashion—they manage to be reasonably diverting."

TV Guide rated the film one out of a possible four stars and wrote "Roth's novel was very funny and often shocking for its own sake, but the film, an embarrassment for everyone involved, fails miserably in adapting the book to the big screen...the production, done so slickly, does veil, to some degree, the horrible script and bad performances."

See also
 List of American films of 1972

References

External links
 
 
 

1972 films
1972 directorial debut films
1972 comedy films
American comedy films
Films scored by Michel Legrand
Films about Jews and Judaism
Films based on American novels
Films based on works by Philip Roth
Films directed by Ernest Lehman
Films produced by Ernest Lehman
Films set in New York City
Films with screenplays by Ernest Lehman
Warner Bros. films
1970s English-language films
1970s American films